Mina Rosner (1913–1997) was a native of Buczacz, Galicia, Austria-Hungary (now Buchach, Ukraine), who survived The Holocaust by hiding with a Polish family.  After the war, she moved to Winnipeg, Manitoba, Canada, with her husband, Michael Rosner. She recorded her war-time experiences in her book I am a Witness. In 1990, she returned to Buchach for the first time since the war, and the visit was captured in a CBC documentary called "Return to Buchach". The documentary won a gold medal at the New York Film and Television Festival in 1992.

External links 
  Foreword and Chapter 1 of "I am a Witness"

1913 births
1997 deaths
Canadian memoirists
Jews from Galicia (Eastern Europe)
Austrian Jews
Jewish Canadian writers
Polish emigrants to Canada
People from Buchach
Holocaust survivors
Canadian women memoirists
20th-century Canadian women writers
20th-century Canadian non-fiction writers
20th-century memoirists